"The Woman Before Me" is a song written by Jude Johnstone and recorded by the American country music artist Trisha Yearwood. It was released in March 1992 as the fourth single from the album Trisha Yearwood. The song reached number 4 on the US Billboard Hot Country Singles & Tracks chart.

Chart performance

Year-end charts

References

1992 singles
Trisha Yearwood songs
Song recordings produced by Garth Fundis
MCA Records singles
Songs written by Jude Johnstone
1991 songs